Artux, Artush, and officially rendered as Atush, is a county-level city and the capital of the Kyrgyz autonomous prefecture of Kizilsu in Xinjiang, China. The government seat is in Guangminglu Subdistrict.

History

In January 1943, Artux County was established.

In June 1986, Artux County became Artux City.

In 2018, the dome of Eshtachi Mosque was removed. In recent times other mosques have been taken down too.

The Artux City Vocational Skills Education Training Service Center in Artux is one of the Xinjiang re-education camps.

At 10:23 pm on January 19, 2020, a 5.2 magnitude earthquake struck in Artux.

Geography and climate
It is situated in the northwest part of the Tarim Basin, south of the Tien Shan mountains. Like most of Xinjiang, Artux has a cool arid climate (Köppen BWk) with hot summers, freezing winters and little precipitation and low humidity year-round. Most of this limited precipitation falls from erratic thunderstorms in the summer months, although at this time relative humidity averages less than 35 percent.

Administrative divisions
Artux includes three subdistricts, one town, six townships and one other area:

Subdistricts ( / ):
Bext Avenue Subdistrict (Xingfu Lu;  / ), Nurluq Avenue Subdistrict (Guangming Lu;  / ), Xincheng Subdistrict

Town ( / ):
Ustun Atush (Shang'atushi;  / )

Townships ( / ):
Süntag (Songtake, Suntagh;  / ), Azak (Azhake, Azaq;  / ), Agu (Ahu, Aghu;  / ), Katyaylak (Gedaliang, Kattaylaq;  / ),  Karajül (Halajun, Karajol, Qarajol;  / ), Tugurmiti (Tugumaiti;  / )

Other areas:
Bingtuan Nongsanshi Hongqi Farm

The city had two subdistricts, five townships and three farms under its jurisdiction in 2018.

Economy
Artux's economy is primarily agriculture, the agricultural products are mainly cotton, grapes, and sheep.

Industries in Artux include salt-making, cotton-ginning, food processing and cooking oil processing. Agricultural products include wheat, corn, sorghum, sesame, rice and others, and the local specialty is the common fig. Sheep are the main livestock in Artux.

Demographics

, 81.5% of the population of Artux was Uyghur.

, 79.68% of the population of Artux was Uyghur and 7.21% of the population was Han Chinese.

, 216,651 (80.44%) of the 269,317 residents of Artux were Uyghur, 30,174 (11.20%) were Kyrgyz, 21,754 (8.08%) were Han Chinese and 738 were from other ethnic groups.

Transportation
Artux is served by the Southern Xinjiang Railway.

Notable persons
 Saifuddin Azizi, first chairman of the Xinjiang
 Sabit Damolla, Prime Minister of East Turkestan (1933-4)
 Salih Hudayar
 Sultan Satuq Bughra Khan
 Ilham Tohti
 Anwar Yusuf Turani
 Ghulam Osman Yaghma, President of the East Turkistan Government-in-Exile

Historical maps
Historical English-language maps including Artux:

Notes

References

Populated places in Xinjiang
County-level divisions of Xinjiang
Kizilsu Kyrgyz Autonomous Prefecture